The 2nd Aerobic Gymnastics World Championships were held in The Hague, Netherlands on 19 and 20 October 1996.

Results

Men's Individual

Women's Individual

Mixed Pair

Trio

Medal table 

Aerobic Gymnastics World Championships
Aerobic Gymnastics World Championships
Aerobic Gymnastics World Championships
Aerobic Gymnastics World Championships
International gymnastics competitions hosted by the Netherlands